The 1939–40 Kansas Jayhawks men's basketball team represented the University of Kansas during the 1939–40 college men's basketball season. They were coached by Phog Allen. The Jayhawks qualified for the NCAA tournament, which was played for the first time the previous season, for the first time in school history. They would lose to Indiana in the national championship game.

Roster
Robert Allen
Donald Ebling
Howard Engleman
Richard Harp
William Hogben
Thomas Hunter
Bob Johnson
John Kline
Ralph Miller
Charles Nees
Jack Sands
Bruce Voran
Maurice Jackson

Schedule

References

Kansas
NCAA Division I men's basketball tournament Final Four seasons
Kansas
Kansas Jayhawks men's basketball seasons
Kansas
Kansas